The Free Trade Unions (SSS) was a central trade union organization in Bulgaria. SSS was founded in August 1904, and was politically tied to the Bulgarian Social Democratic Workers Party (Obedinena). As of 1904, SSS had 1,188 members. By 1907 the membership had risen to 1,884.

References

Trade unions in Bulgaria
1904 establishments in Bulgaria

Trade unions established in 1904